Irina Rozova (born 23 January 1958) is a journalist and politician from Lithuania. A member of the Russian Alliance party, she served in the Seimas on the Lithuanian Poles' Electoral Action-Christian Family Association Group election list.

Early life
Irina Rozova was born on 23 January 1958 in Klaipėda. She earned her diploma in journalism from the Lomonosov Moscow State University.

Career
In 1981, Rozova was appointed the music director of the State Committee for Television and Radio Broadcasting in Omsk Oblast, a post she held until 1984, when she was transferred to the Kaliningrad Oblast. Rozova has been a radio presenter at two stations Laluna and Raduga during 1996–2006. In 2002 she joined the Russian Alliance and was elected to the Klaipėda City Municipal Council a year later. She became the deputy governor of Klaipėda County in 2005. She has also taught English language at secondary schools in Klaipėda.

From 2006–2008, Rozova was a member of the Ninth Seimas and served on its committee for Development of Information Society. She served in the Eleventh Seimas from 2012 to 2016, and she was re-elected in 2016 to the Twelfth Seimas. In June 2017, she became the deputy chair of the parliamentary Commission for Addiction Prevention.

Personal life
Rozova is married with two children.

References

1958 births
Living people
21st-century Lithuanian women politicians
21st-century Lithuanian politicians
People from Klaipėda
Moscow State University alumni
Members of the Seimas
Electoral Action of Poles in Lithuania – Christian Families Alliance politicians
Women members of the Seimas